Fun and Games is a 1979 album recorded by the American flugelhorn player Chuck Mangione, who released it on the A&M Records label. It included the song "Give It All You Got", which ABC Sports used for the 1980 Winter Olympics, as well as a slower version of that song, "Give It All You Got, But Slowly". The latter was also used during the '80s as sign-off music for many American television stations.

Track listing
All tracks composed and arranged by Chuck Mangione:

Personnel
 Chuck Mangione - Flugelhorn, electric piano
 Grant Geissman - Electric guitar, acoustic guitar, 12 string guitar
 James Bradley, Jr. - Drums, congas, triangle
 Charles Meeks - Bass guitar, harmonica
 Bill Reichenbach Jr. - Trombone
 Chris Vadala - Flute, soprano saxophone, tenor saxophone, piccolo, alto flute

References

1979 albums
Chuck Mangione albums
A&M Records albums